Llera may refer to:

 Llera, Badajoz, a municipality in Badajoz, Extremadura, Spain
 Llera, Tamaulipas, a municipality in Tamaulipas, Mexico
 La Llera, a parish in Colunga, Asturias, Spain
 La Llera (Villaviciosa), a parish in Villaviciosa, Asturias, Spain
 Miguel Llera, Spanish football defender